Zara Trade Center, commonly known as Zara Towers is an 85- and 89-meter tall commercial twin tower complex, located in Amman, Jordan.  The towers feature conference rooms, offices, cinemas, a shopping mall and exhibition halls. The two towers are connected by a pedestrian bridge.

References

See also
 List of tallest buildings in Amman
 List of twin buildings and structures

Buildings and structures in Amman
Skyscrapers in Amman
Tourist attractions in Amman
Skyscraper office buildings
Retail buildings in Jordan
Office buildings completed in 1996